Willard F. Somerset (born March 17, 1942) is an American former professional basketball player. Born in Sharon, Pennsylvania, Somerset attended Farrell High School in Farrell, Pennsylvania and later, Duquesne University in Pittsburgh, Pennsylvania.

A 5'8" guard from Duquesne University, Somerset played eight games for the Baltimore Bullets during the 1965–66 NBA season, averaging 5.6 points per game. He blossomed in the American Basketball Association, where he averaged 22.8 points in 135 games with the Houston Mavericks and New York Nets from 1967 to 1969. During the 1968–69 ABA season, when he was named an All-Star, Somerset ranked fifth in the league in points per game, eighth in assists per game, and third in free throw percentage.

After his playing career, Willie became a pharmacist and retired from the profession in 2012.

Somerset was named one of the "Outstanding Young Men of America" in 1968. He was inducted into the Duquesne University Sports Hall of Fame in 1976 and into the Pennsylvania Sports Hall of Fame in 1982 (Western Chapter) and in 1994.  In 1997, Somerset was inducted into the Mercer County Hall of Fame.

See also
 List of shortest players in National Basketball Association history

References

External links

1942 births
Living people
American men's basketball players
Baltimore Bullets (1963–1973) draft picks
Baltimore Bullets (1963–1973) players
Basketball players from Pennsylvania
Duquesne Dukes men's basketball players
Houston Mavericks players
New York Nets players
People from Sharon, Pennsylvania
Point guards